The 1964 Old Dominion 500 was a NASCAR Grand National Series event that was held on September 24, 1964, at Martinsville Speedway in Martinsville, Virginia. Forty professional stock car racing drivers would become involved in an event that would become legendary.

The transition to purpose-built racecars began in the early 1960s and occurred gradually over that decade.  Changes made to the sport by the late 1960s brought an end to the "strictly stock" vehicles of the 1950s.

Background
Martinsville Speedway is one of five short tracks to hold NASCAR races. The track's turns are banked at eleven degrees, while the front stretch, the location of the finish line, is banked at zero degrees. The back stretch also has a zero degree banking.

Race report
Lorenzen would also pick up his third win in a row at Martinsville.

In addition to six changes in the lead driver, there were also six caution flags given out for 28 laps. The entire race took three hours and twenty-four minutes to go from green flag to the checkered flag. Top prize at the race was $4,715 ($ when adjusted for inflation). Doug Yates and Buddy Arrington both qualified for the race but failed to start in it. Major Melton would make his final NASCAR Grand National Cup Series appearance in this race. The majority of the entries belonged to the Ford Motor Company. Model years for each vehicle ranged from 1962 to 1964; complying with the NASCAR rules and regulations for that era.

NASCAR was authorized to hand out a grand total of $17,580 to each of the drivers who participated in this event ($ when adjusted for inflation). Even with his second-place finish, Petty clinched his first NASCAR championship after this race. Bill Whitley was credited as the actual last-place driver after acquiring a transmission problem on lap 6; bringing home a paycheck of $150 ($ when adjusted for inflation).

At least 16 notable crew chiefs were recorded as attending this race; including Bud Moore, Herman Beam, Glen Wood, Bud Allman, Banjo Matthews and Vic Ballard.

Doug Wilson would retire from the NASCAR Cup Series after this race.

Qualifying

A non-championship race determined the final 20 starters in the Old Dominion 500. Only Richard Petty and Doug Yates managed to lead laps in the event; Petty would go on to win the qualifying race.

Top 20 finishers

Timeline
Section reference: 
 Start of race: Fred Lorenzen had the pole position to begin the race; Doug Yates and Buddy Arrington failed to start the race.
 Lap 6: Transmission problems forced Bill Whitley into the sidelines.
 Lap 11: Ronnie Croy would have oil pressure issues with his vehicle.
 Lap 18: Faulty brakes would relegate Jack Anderson to the sidelines.
 Lap 44: An overheating vehicle forced Buddy Baker off the track.
 Lap 124: Bunkie Blackburn would fail to finish the race due to issues with his vehicle's clutch.
 Lap 128: Bob Derrington's vehicle lost his rear end, forcing him off the track for safety reasons.
 Lap 164: Richard Petty took over the lead from Fred Lorenzen.
 Lap 165: Transmission problems managed to end Neil Castles' hopes of winning the event.
 Lap 169: Fred Lorenzen took over the lead from Richard Petty.
 Lap 171: Ned Jarrett took over the lead from Fred Lorenzen.
 Lap 172: Fred Lorenzen took over the lead from Ned Jarrett.
 Lap 184: Paul Goldsmith started feeling some "bad vibrations" from his vehicle.
 Lap 260: Doug Wilson managed to overheat his vehicle when he needed it the most.
 Lap 268: A wheel bearing came off Bill McMahan's vehicle.
 Lap 325: Bobby Johns had a terminal crash, forcing him to leave the event prematurely.
 Lap 338: Doug Cooper's brakes no longer worked, forcing him out of the race.
 Lap 339: Major Melton fell out with engine failure.
 Lap 340: Junior Johnson took over the lead from Fred Lorenzen.
 Lap 341: Fred Lorenzen took over the lead from Junior Johnson.
 Lap 344: LeeRoy Yarborough's vehicle started handling a little bit too funny, causing him not to finish the race.
 Lap 380: Wendell Scott managed to lose the rear end of his vehicle.
 Lap 383: Jim Paschal managed to lose the rear end of his vehicle.
 Lap 397: Elmo Langley managed to lose the rear end of his vehicle.
 Lap 414: Curtis Crider managed to lose his vehicle's rear end.
 Finish: Fred Lorenzen was officially declared the winner of the event.

References

Old Dominion 500
Old Dominion 500
NASCAR races at Martinsville Speedway